Image SXM is an image analysis software specialized in scanning microscope images. It is based on the public domain software NIH Image (now ImageJ from the National Institutes of Health) and extended to handle scanning microscope images, especially of the SxM formats (SAM, SCM, SEM, SFM, SLM, SNOM, SPM, STM), hence its name.

Features 
Image SXM supports image stacks, a series of images that share a single window. It can calculate area and pixel value statistics of user-defined selections and intensity thresholded objects. It can measure distances and angles. It can create density histograms and line profile plots. It supports standard image processing functions such as logical and arithmetical operations between images, contrast manipulation, convolution, Fourier analysis, sharpening, smoothing, edge detection and median filtering. It does geometric transformations such as image scaling, rotation and flips. The program supports any number of images simultaneously, limited only by available memory.

History 

Image SXM is based upon a similar freeware image analysis program known as NIH Image (that had been developed by the National Institutes of Health for Macintosh computers running pre-Mac OS X operating systems), now become ImageJ.

See also 
 Microscope image processing

References

 Barrett, Steve (2008). "What is Image SXM?", October 2008

External links 
 ImageSXM.org.uk – official web address

NIH Image 
 NIH Image home page
 Scion Image Download

Image processing software
Freeware